Such a Funky Thang! is the third album of Japanese singer Toshinobu Kubota, released on September 30, 1988. The album peaked at number one and was certified million. According to Sony Music Entertainment Japan's annual report, the album was Kubota's highest-selling album to date as well as the best-selling album in 1988 for CBS/Sony Group.

Recording
Kubota began recording the album in 1987. In October 1987, Kubota performed at Japan's charity event "Japan Aid 2nd Festival" in Showa Kinen Park, Tokyo, Japan. During the concert, Kubota was introduced to the George Duke Band who were also performing. Impressed with their performance, Kubota requested that George Duke produce his upcoming album. Kubota also requested the vocals of Lynn Davis, of the George Duke Band, on his album. Kubota and Davis eventually began writing songs together, with Duke producing most of the songs. Davis penned her background vocals on most of the album's songs including "Dance If You Want It", "Love Reborn", "Gone, Gone, Gone", "Boxer", "Drunkard Terry", "I Remember A Dream"; and featured on "Indigo Waltz", "Such a Funky Thang!", and "Such a Funky Thang! (Reprise)".

Release and promotion
The album was released on September 30, 1988 by Sony Music Entertainment Japan who also distributed the album exclusively in Japan. The album was released in compact disc, LP, and 12-inch vinyl formats. In 1989, Kubota toured with Lynn Davis, whom he invited to performing his backup vocalist and duet partner. He headlined his own concert tour called "I Need Your Funky Thang!" in Japan, which Davis toured as his backup vocalist. Kubota also performed on various television programs to promote the album, most of which he was joined by Davis.

Singles
In November 1988, the album's first single "Dance If You Want It" was released, which charted at number 3 on the Oricon Singles. The single also sold over 151,630 copies in Japan, making it gold-status by the RIAJ. The second single "Indigo Waltz", featuring Lynn Davis, was released in January 1989. The single sold over 102,270 copies in Japan, becoming certified gold-status by the RIAJ.

In March 1989, the third single "High Roller" was released and charted at number 11 on the Oricon Singles chart.

Track listing
Dance If You Want It
High Roller
Love Reborn
Yo Bro!
Merry Merry Miracle
Such A Funky Thang! (featuring Lynn Davis)
Gone Gone Gone
すべての山に登れ
Boxer
Indigo Waltz (featuring Lynn Davis)
Drunkard Terry
覚えていた夢 (I Remember A Dream)
Such A Funky Thang! (Reprise) (featuring Lynn Davis)

References

1988 albums
Toshinobu Kubota albums
Sony Music albums